David Tangata-Toa (born 15 July 1981) is an Australian former professional rugby league footballer and current assistant coach for the Canterbury-Bankstown Bulldogs in the National Rugby League (NRL).

Background
Born on the Gold Coast, Queensland, Tangata-Toa played junior rugby league for the Burleigh Bears and attended Palm Beach Currumbin State High School.

Playing career
A lower grader with the St George Illawarra Dragons and Cronulla Sharks, Tangata-Toa moved to England in 2005, joining the Hull Kingston Rovers in the National League One. In 2006, he played in their National League One Grand Final winning side, helping them earn promotion to the Super League. In 2007, he played 17 Super League games for the club, scoring three tries.

In 2008, Tangata-Toa joined the Celtic Crusaders, scoring a try in their National League One Grand Final loss to the Salford City Reds. In 2009, he played 19 Super League games for the Crusaders, scoring four tries.

Coaching career
In 2011, Tangata-Toa became captain-coach of the Windsor Wolves in the Bundaberg Red Cup. In 2012, he moved up to Windsor's New South Wales Cup side as an assistant coach.

In 2013, Tangata-Toa joined the Penrith Panthers as an assistant coach to their under-20 side. In Round 7, Tangata-Toa replaced Garth Brennan, who moved up to the club's NSW Cup side, as the head coach.  Brennan later returned to the role before the finals series began. From 2014 to 2016, he worked as an assistant coach to the Panthers' NSW Cup side. In 2016, he became the assistant coach of the Tongan national team under head coach Kristian Woolf.

In 2017, he once again took charge of Penrith's under-20 side, leading them to the finals.

In 2018, Tangata-Toa became head coach of the Townsville Blackhawks under-20 side, where he led the side to the minor premiership and Grand Final. In 2019, he joined the North Queensland Cowboys as an assistant coach.

On 21 September, Tangata-Toa joined the Canterbury-Bankstown Bulldogs as a transition coach after two years with the Cowboys.

Personal life
Tangata-Toa's older brother, Andrew, is a former professional rugby league player.

References

1981 births
Living people
Australian sportspeople of Tongan descent
Australian rugby league coaches
Australian rugby league players
Crusaders Rugby League players
Hull Kingston Rovers players
Rugby league players from Gold Coast, Queensland
Rugby league props
Rugby league second-rows
Windsor Wolves players